Prince Mustafa Al-Shihabi (1893 – 1968) was a Syrian agronomist, politician, writer and the third elected director of Arab Academy of Damascus (1959–1968).

"Prince" title was only of a social background, with no real principality under his control.

Biography
Al-Shihabi was born in 1893 in Hasbaya in Ottoman Syria, in what is today Lebanon. After getting his degree in agriculture from Paris, France in 1915, he initially resided in Istanbul while working for the Ministry of Agriculture of the Ottoman Government. During World War I, al-Shihabi joined the Arab Revolt in an attempt to free the Levant region from Ottoman Turkish control. In 1928, while serving as the director of the Syrian Ministry of Agriculture and Agrarian Reform, al-Shihabi joined the National Bloc in opposition to the French Mandate for Syria and the Lebanon. He later served as the head of the Syrian Ministry of Education under Prime Minister of Syria Ata al-Ayyubi as well. In 1936, President of Syria Hashim al-Atassi appointed al-Shihabi as the governor of Aleppo, a post al-Shihabi was to hold until 1939.

In January 1943, al-Shihabi was appointed as the head of the Syrian Ministry of Finance by Prime Minister Jamil al-Ulshi, though he stepped down that March due to what he perceived as al-Ulshi's pro-French views. When al-Ayyubi took the position of Prime Minister for a second term, al-Shihabi retook his position in the Ministry of Finance. He was appointed as the governor of Latakia by President Shukri al-Quwatli, and was instrumental in the defeat of Sulayman al-Murshid's Alawite uprising. Al-Shihabi was promoted to the rank of secretary-general of the Syrian Council of Ministers in addition to second terms as the governor of both Aleppo and Latakia. Unlike other Quwalti-era officials, al-Shihabi remained in favor with Husni al-Za'im after the latter's CIA-supported coup d'état. After the subsequent coup of Adib Shishakli, al-Shihabi was designated as Syria's ambassador to Egypt.

He died in 1968 in Damascus and was buried there.

Legacy
He exerted strong efforts for Arabization and modernizing the Arabic language by writing many comprehensive modern term indices of science and technology in Arabic. He also has many writings regarding Arab nationalism and the struggle against colonialism.

Al-Shihabi was a critic of Turkification under the Ottoman Empire, viewing the 1908 Ottoman constitution as a blow to the status of Arabic.

Citations

1893 births
1968 deaths
Shihab family
Syrian ministers of education
Agriculture ministers of Syria
Syrian ministers of finance
20th-century Syrian writers
Syrian people of Arab descent
Arab grammarians
People from Damascus
Ambassadors of Syria to Egypt
Syrian Freemasons